Maoritomella orientalis is a species of sea snail, a marine gastropod mollusk in the family Borsoniidae.

Description
The height of the shell attains 10.5 mm, its width 4 mm.

Distribution
This marine species occurs off New Zealand and off Tasmania (Australia)

References

 Dell, Richard Kenneth. The archibenthal mollusca of New Zealand. Dominion Museum, 1956.
 Powell, A.W.B. 1979: New Zealand Mollusca: Marine, Land and Freshwater Shells, Collins, Auckland
 Spencer H.G., Willan R.C., Marshall B.A. & Murray T.J. (2011). Checklist of the Recent Mollusca Recorded from the New Zealand Exclusive Economic Zone

External links
 
  Bouchet P., Kantor Yu.I., Sysoev A. & Puillandre N. (2011) A new operational classification of the Conoidea. Journal of Molluscan Studies 77: 273–308
 Image at the Museum of New Zealand TE PAPA TONGAREWA

orientalis
Gastropods of New Zealand
Gastropods described in 1956